Anthony Yigit (born 1 September 1991) is a Swedish professional boxer. As an amateur, following his success in 2011 World Amateur Boxing Championships, Yigit qualified for the 2012 Summer Olympics.

He is of Turkish, Finnish and Russian descent. He is a member of Hammarby IF and regularly trains with the club.

Olympics 
At the 2012 Summer Olympics, Yigit reached the second round, where he lost to Denys Berinchyk.

Professional career 
Yigit turned pro by signing with promotional company Team Sauerland in 2013. Touted as one of the most talented Swedish prospects in a while and a great addition to the 'Nordic Fight Nights' event organized by Team Sauerland, he went on to win his pro debut in Denmark on 13 April 2013.

On February 11, 2017, Yigit fought against veteran boxer Lenny Daws for the vacant European Super Lightweight title. Despite the hostile crowd in the UK, Yigit managed to masterfully outbox Daws to capture the title.

In 2017, Yigit had two notable unanimous decision wins against Spaniard Sandor Martin and Brit Joe Hughes, which would eventually lead him to entering the junior welterweight World Boxing Super Series tournament. These wins in 2017 would subsequently lead to Yigit being named 'Champion of the Year' by the European Boxing Union for 2017.

World Boxing Super Series 
Anthony Yigit, who was ranked #3 by the IBF, #5 by the WBO and #7 by the WBC at the time, entered the WBSS and was set to face Belarusian junior welterweight Ivan Baranchyk, who was ranked #2 by the IBF and #8 by the WBC. The fight would be for the vacant IBF junior welterweight title as a part of the WBSS quarter finals. Baranchyk would end up being too much for the Swede overwhelming him with relentless pressure, the referee went on to stop the contest at the end of round 7 due to a gruesome injury on Yigit's eye.

Yigit vs. Romero 
After a two-year layoff since his previous fight, Yigit returned to the ring on July 17, 2021 in San Antonio, Texas on the undercard of Jermell Charlo vs. Brian Castaño to face undefeated WBA interim lightweight champion Rolando Romero on short notice after Romero's original opponent pulled out. Romero's title was no longer at stake when Yigit weighed in 5.2 lbs over the 135 lb limit, but the fight nonetheless went ahead. On the night, Romero dropped Yigit multiple times en route to a seventh-round technical knockout victory, handing Yigit his second professional loss.

Professional boxing record

References

External links
 
 AIBA-London Profile
Anthony Yigit - Profile, News Archive & Current Rankings at Box.Live

1991 births
Living people
Light-welterweight boxers
Olympic boxers of Sweden
Boxers at the 2012 Summer Olympics
Swedish male boxers
Swedish people of Turkish descent
Swedish people of Russian descent
Swedish people of Finnish descent
Sportspeople from Stockholm